The Year of Return, Ghana 2019 is an initiative of the government of Ghana – along with the U.S.-based Adinkra Group – that is intended to encourage African diasporans to come to Africa (specifically Ghana) to settle and invest in the continent. It was formally launched by President Nana Akufo-Addo in September 2018 in Washington, D.C. as a program for Africans in the diaspora to unite with Africans. The year 2019 is symbolic as it commemorates 400 years since the first enslaved Africans touched down in Hampton, in the English colony of Virginia in America. The program also recognizes the diaspora's achievements and sacrifices in the time since that event. Starting from when President Barack Obama made a visit to the Cape Coast in 2009, many famous, respected and admired African-Americans from the diaspora have visited Ghana to discover its culture. The Ghana Tourism Authority and the Ministry of Tourism, Arts and Culture lined up a slate of activities in "celebration of the resilience of the African spirit." Many African Americans shared their stories regarding their experiences in Ghana during the Year of Return.

Objectives 

 To make Ghana a key travel destination for African Americans and the rest of the African diaspora.
 To rebuild the lost past of these 400 years.
 To promote investment in Ghana and foster relationships with African Americans and the African diaspora.

Visitors 
Sheila Jackson Lee linked the initiative with the 400 Years of African-American History Commission Act that was passed in Congress in 2017. American actor and director Michael Jai White visited Ghana towards the end of 2018. Over 40 African diasporans participated in the "Full Circle Festival", which aimed to attract visitors to the country. The list includes but not limited to

 Idris Elba
 Boris Kodjoe 
 Naomi Campbell 
 Anthony Anderson 
 Kofi Kingston 
 Adrienne-Joi Johnson 
 Steve Harvey 
 Cardi B 
 T.I. 
 Ludacris
 Rick Ross
 Akon
Rosario Dawson
Diggy Simmons
Jidenna
Michael Jai White
Nicole Ari Parker
Conan O'Brien
Koffee
Sam Richardson

The Akwamuhene Odeneho Kwafo Akoto III, the Akwamu Paramount Chief, enstooled Michael Jai White as Nana Oduapong during his visit. Chief White's title means "The tree with strong roots that does not fear the storm".

Revenue
Up to 1.5 million tourists, including celebrities, politicians and world leaders, are expected in the country by the end of the year with up to 1.9 billion dollars also expected to be accrued in revenue as a result of the Year of Return activities.
The tourism sector has also recorded a tremendous growth of 18% in international arrivals from the Americas, Britain, Caribbean and other key countries while total airport arrivals increased by 45% for the year.

Its estimated spending of tourists has seen a significant increase from $1,862 in 2017 to the current figure of $2,589 per tourist, with the impact of tourism on the economy estimated to be about $1.9 billion.

Events 
Afrochella
Afro Nation
Back To Our Roots Tour
Detty Rave
Decemba to Rememba
Crusade 4
Bliss on the hills
Live X Festival
The Waakye summit
Afrochic Diaspora Festival
Potomanto Art Festival
Accra Under the Stars
The Black Gala
Gold Coast Experience
AkwaabaUK
Black Is Black
PineXGinja
Meet The Moon Girls
Polo Beach Club
JD music festival - Djsky
Panafest

See also
African Americans in Ghana
Back-to-Africa movement
Diaspora tourism
Door of Return
Genealogy tourism (Africa)
Return to roots
Right of return (Ghana)

References 

2019 in Ghana
African and Black nationalism in the United States
African culture
African diaspora history
African-American culture
African-American diaspora
American expatriates in Ghana
Festivals in Ghana
Ghana–United States relations
Ghanaian diaspora
Immigration to Ghana
Pan-Africanism in Ghana
Post–civil rights era in African-American history
Repatriated Africans
Tourism in Ghana
Transatlantic relations
Presidency of Nana Akufo-Addo